Morten Bødskov (born 1 May 1970 in Karup) is a Danish Social Democratic politician, and member of the Folketing, currently serving as the Minister for Business since 2022. He previously served as Minister of Defence from February to December 2022 and Minister for Taxation under Frederiksen and Minister of Justice in the Government of Helle Thorning-Schmidt.

Political career

Early beginnings

At age 15 Bødskov joined the Social Democratic Youth of Denmark (DSU), where he quickly assumed numerous positions of trust. In 1996, he took over as federal president of the DSU from Henrik Sass Larsen. In 2001, he was elected to the Folketing and in 2005 Helle Thorning-Schmidt appointed him as deputy chairman of the parliamentary group.

Career in government
From 3 October 2011 to 11 December 2013, Bødskov served as Minister of Justice. As Minister of Justice, Bødskov was among those who spearheaded austerity measures, new restrictions on air guns, a new Probation system and the creation of 200 new prison spots. an increased focus on gang and biker-related crime, ⁣  and the highly controversial amendment to the Public Records Act.

On 27 June 2019, Bødskov became the Minister of Taxation in the Frederiksen Cabinet. In a February 2022 cabinet reshuffle, he was transferred to the role of Minister of Defence.

Personal life
Bødskov has since 2005 been married to Anna Elisabeth Bødskov.

References

External links
 

Danish Justice Ministers
Danish Tax Ministers
Social Democrats (Denmark) politicians
1970 births
Living people
People from Viborg Municipality
Members of the Folketing 2001–2005
Members of the Folketing 2005–2007
Members of the Folketing 2007–2011
Members of the Folketing 2011–2015
Members of the Folketing 2015–2019
Members of the Folketing 2019–2022
Members of the Folketing 2022–2026
Danish Defence Ministers